The 2022 Woking Borough Council election took place on 5 May 2022 to elect one third of members to Woking Borough Council in England coinciding with other local elections held across much of England. In this election, the Liberal Democrats gained control of the council after gaining 4 seats from the Conservative Party. In the Overall Results and the individual Ward Results charts below, the results of 2022 are compared to those of four years previously, in 2018. In 2018, the Conservatives had secured a relatively successful local election result in Woking, winning 5 out of the 10 seats and achieving 45.8% of the overall vote.

Overall Results

Ward Results

Byfleet and West Byfleet

Canalside

Goldsworth Park

Heathlands

Hoe Valley

Horsell

Knaphill

Mount Hermon

Pyrford

St Johns

References

2022 English local elections
Woking Borough Council elections